In a string instrument, the bass bar is a brace running from the foot of the neck to a position under the bridge, which bears much of the tension of the strings. Bass bars are used:

 In the members of the violin family;
 In the members of the viola da gamba family;
 In some archtop guitars;

and in many other string instruments.

According to the A Dictionary of Music and Musicians by George Grove:

References

String instrument construction